Veronika Arichteva,  née Nová (born 20 May 1986 in Prague) is a Czech actress and presenter.

Selected filmography

Films 
 Dům na samotě (2022) 
 Habermann (2010)
 Setkání v Praze (2006)
 Jezerní královna  (1998)

TV series 
 Slunečná (2020)  
 Spravedlnost (2017)
 Policie Modrava (2015)
 The First Republic (2014 - 2018)
 Vyprávěj (2012 - 2013)
 Ordinace v růžové zahradě (2005 - 2008)
Hop nebo trop (2004 - 2008)

References

External links
 
 Biography on csfd.cz
 Instagram profile

1986 births
Living people
Actresses from Prague
Czech film actresses
Czech child actresses
20th-century Czech actresses
21st-century Czech actresses
Czech stage actresses
Czech television actresses
Prague Conservatory alumni